Gerald Peter Buchek (May 9, 1942 – January 2, 2019) was an American middle infielder and third baseman who played all or parts of seven seasons in Major League Baseball (MLB) for the St. Louis Cardinals and New York Mets.

Career
Born in St. Louis, Missouri, Buchek signed a $59,000 bonus contract with his hometown Cardinals upon graduation from McKinley High School.

In 1964, Buchek played in only 35 games, largely as a backup to shortstop Dick Groat and second baseman Julián Javier, collecting six hits in 30 at bats. But it was a memorable season, as the Cardinals prevailed in a late-September four-team pennant scramble to win their first National League title in 18 years. Then they defeated the New York Yankees in seven games in the 1964 World Series. Buchek appeared as a defensive replacement in four games at second base, and in his lone plate appearance, in Game 6, he singled off Jim Bouton.

However, with Groat (then Dal Maxvill) and Javier established as the Redbirds' double-play combination, he did not break into the regular lineup, starting a total of 69 games at shortstop and 20 at second base during those two seasons. On May 12, 1966, he scored the first run ever at Busch Memorial Stadium.

Buchek was traded along with Art Mahaffey and Tony Martínez from the Cardinals to the Mets for Ed Bressoud, Danny Napoleon and cash on April 1, 1967. The Mets were seeking a new second baseman after trading four-year veteran Ron Hunt to the Los Angeles Dodgers. The Mets' general manager, Bing Devine, had signed Buchek when he was front-office boss of the Cardinals in 1960. In 1967, Buchek started 92 games at second base (along with 14 games at third base and five at shortstop), and set personal bests in games played (124), hits (97), home runs (14) and runs batted in (41). Among Mets fans he was known for starting an improbable comeback victory against the Atlanta Braves on July 9, 1967. Down 4–3 in the bottom of the ninth with two outs and nobody on base, Buchek, batting .230, was sent in to pinch hit for Bud Harrelson, who already had four hits, including a double, that game. Buchek hit a home run to tie the game, and the Mets went on to score another run to win 5–4.

During that off-season, Buchek was traded twice, first back to the Cardinals and then to the Philadelphia Phillies. He spent 1969 with the Phillies' Triple-A Eugene farm club, where he batted .246 in 127 games, then retired from baseball at age 27. For his MLB career, he batted .220 with 259 hits, 35 doubles, 11 triples, 22 home runs and 108 runs batted in in 421 games played.

Buchek died on January 2, 2019, in Springfield, Missouri, at the age of 76.

References

External links

1942 births
2019 deaths
Atlanta Crackers players
Baseball players from St. Louis
Eugene Emeralds players
Florida Instructional League Cardinals players
Major League Baseball second basemen
Major League Baseball shortstops
New York Mets players
Portland Beavers players
Rochester Red Wings players
St. Louis Cardinals players
Tulsa Oilers (baseball) players